The Brandon Shores Generating Station is an electric generating station located on Fort Smallwood Road north of Orchard Beach in Anne Arundel County, Maryland, near Glen Burnie, and is operated by Raven Power Holdings, Inc. Brandon Shores consists of two Babcock & Wilcox coal-fired boilers and two General Electric steam turbines with a combined nominal generating capacity of 1370 MWe. Unit 1 went into operation in May 1984 and Unit 2 in May 1991.

The station shares a  site adjacent to the Patapsco River with the Herbert A. Wagner Generating Station. The Brandon Shores plant dominates the site with its  exhaust and  flue-gas desulfurization (FGD) system stacks. Talen Energy will convert the coal-fired units to alternative fuels by 2025.

Coal delivery
The Brandon Shores and Wagner Generating Stations consume approximately 4.8 million tons of coal annually. Coal for both stations is delivered by barge. Although there is a railroad spur into the site, it is unused and would require improvements to restore it to an operational state.

Environmental violations 
Constellation Energy disposed fly ash from Brandon Shores at a former sand and gravel mine in Gambrills, Maryland during 1996 to 2007. The ash contaminated groundwater with heavy metals. The Maryland Department of the Environment issued a fine of $1 million to Constellation. Nearby residents filed a lawsuit against Constellation and in 2008 the company settled the case for $54 million.

Renovation
In order to meet Maryland requirements for reductions of nitrogen oxides, sulfur dioxide and mercury, the plant was substantially renovated between 2007 and 2010. A new  twin FGD stack was built to replace the existing  stacks, which have been capped and are inoperative. Flue gas from the boilers is routed through the emissions control system that sprays the exhaust with a limestone slurry and collects gypsum for use in wallboard and fly ash for use in concrete. The system uses treated municipal wastewater from the Anne Arundel County Cox Creek wastewater treatment plant as the source of water for making the limestone slurry.

2012 sale
The plant was originally constructed by a predecessor company of Constellation Energy, which was purchased by Exelon in 2012. On August 9, 2012, Exelon announced that it had reached an agreement for the sale of the Charles P. Crane, Brandon Shores, and Herbert A. Wagner Generating Stations to Raven Power Holdings LLC, a newly formed portfolio company of Riverstone Holdings LLC, for approximately $400 million. Exelon had committed to divest the plants as condition for regulatory approval of its merger with Constellation Energy to alleviate concerns regarding potential market power in the regional wholesale electricity market. The sale was completed on November 30, 2012.

Scheduled closure 
On November 10, 2020 Talen Energy (parent company of Raven Power) announced that it will stop burning coal at the Brandon Shores and Wagner plants by the end of 2025. The plants will be converted to use alternative fuel sources.

Dispatch of electricity
The electrical output of Brandon Shores Generating Station is dispatched by the PJM Interconnection regional transmission organization.

See also

List of power stations in Maryland

References

External links
 Brandon Shores Plant - Talen Energy

Energy infrastructure completed in 1984
Energy infrastructure completed in 1991
Buildings and structures in Anne Arundel County, Maryland
Coal-fired power stations in Maryland
1984 establishments in Maryland